Detective Lloyd (1931) is a 12-chapter Universal movie serial. A co-production between the American company Universal and the British company General Films, it was filmed entirely in Britain with British and Commonwealth actors. It was the only sound serial ever produced in the UK. Although a print was shown on British and Swedish TV as recently as the 1970s, the film is now considered lost.

It was also known by the titles Lloyd of the C.I.D. and In the Hands of the Hinfu.  Detective Lloyd battled a villain known as the Panther in this serial.  Material from the serial was edited into a feature film version called The Green Spot Mystery (1932), which is also a lost film. Detective Lloyd is on the British Film Institute's BFI 75 Most Wanted list of lost films.

Cast
 Jack Lloyd - as Inspector Lloyd
 Muriel Angelus - as Sybil Craig
 Wallace Geoffrey  - as The Panther
 Lewis Dayton - as Randall Hale
 Janice Adair - as Diana Brooks
 Tracy Holmes - as Chester Dunn
 Emily Fitzroy - as The Manor Ghost
 Humberston Wright - as the Lodgekeeper
 Gibb McLaughlin - as Abdul
 Earle Stanley - as Salam 
 Cecil Musk - as Fouji 
 John Turnbull - Barclay of Scotland Yard
 Shayle Gardner - as police inspector
 Vi Kaley - as the charwoman
 Harry Gunn - as yokel
 Frank Dane - as henchman
 Fewlass Llewelyn - as Museum Curator

Chapter titles
 The Green Spot Murder
 The Panther Strikes
 The Trap Springs 
 Tracked by Wireless
 The Death Ray
 The Poison Dart
 The Race with Death
 The Panther's Lair
 Imprisoned in the North Tower
 The Panther's Cunning
 The Panther at Bay
 Heroes of the Law
Source:

See also
 List of American films of 1931
 List of film serials by year
 List of film serials by studio

References

External links

1931 films
1931 crime films
American black-and-white films
American detective films
British detective films
1930s English-language films
Films directed by Henry MacRae
Films directed by Ray Taylor
Lost American films
Universal Pictures film serials
American crime films
1931 lost films
Lost crime films
1930s American films
1930s British films